Jazz Iosefa Tevaga (born 4 September 1995) is a Samoa international rugby league footballer who plays as a  and  for the New Zealand Warriors in the NRL.

Early years
Tevaga was born in Christchurch, New Zealand, and is of Samoan, Maori and European descent. 

Tevaga played his junior football for the Burnham Chevaliers in Christchurch and Papakura Sea Eagles in Auckland and he attended Papakura High School, where he played in the 2013 National Secondary School championship and was selected for the tournament team.

Playing career

Holden Cup
In January 2014, Tevaga attended a Junior Warriors training camp as an open trialist before being signed by the New Zealand Warriors, and playing in the Holden Cup. On 5 October 2014, Tevaga played at lock in the Warriors 2014 Holden Cup grand final winning team who beat the Brisbane Broncos 34-32. In 2015 he played both for the Junior Warriors (where he was co-captain) and in the NSW Cup. On 2 May 2015, Tevaga played for the Junior Kiwis against the Junior Kangaroos, starting at lock in the 22-20 loss at Cbus Super Stadium.

Originally a lock, Tevaga was converted to a  during the 2014 season as he was considered too small for the lock position.

2016
In Round 3 of the 2016 NRL season, Tevaga made his debut for the New Zealand Warriors against the Melbourne Storm as a replacement for an injured Issac Luke in the Warriors 21-14 loss at Mt Smart Stadium. Tevaga became Warrior #209, and played 59 minutes due to an injury to  bench hooker Nathaniel Roache.

2017
He played just 4 NRL games for the Warriors in 2017.

He represented Samoa in the 2017 Rugby League World Cup and played all four games as the starting hooker, scoring a try in their loss to Tonga.

2018
In 2018 he cemented a position as a bench hooker for the Warriors, filling in for the starting 9 Issac Luke. He appeared in 20 games, 19 of which from the bench.  His performance as a specialist bench player was rewarded at the 2018 Dally M Awards when he was given the first Interchange Player Of The Year award.

2019
Tevaga made 22 appearances for New Zealand in the 2019 NRL season as the club missed out on the finals.

2020
Tevaga made 12 appearances for New Zealand in the 2020 NRL season as the club once again missed out on the finals.

2021
In the final round of the 2021 NRL season, Tevaga was sent to the sin bin for fighting in the club's 44-0 loss against the Gold Coast.

2022
Tevaga made a total of 17 appearances for the New Zealand club in the 2022 NRL season as they finished 15th on the table.

References

External links

New Zealand Warriors profile
Warriors profile
2017 RLWC profile

1995 births
Living people
New Zealand rugby league players
New Zealand Māori rugby league players
New Zealand sportspeople of Samoan descent
Rugby league players from Christchurch
New Zealand Warriors players
Junior Kiwis players
Papakura Sea Eagles players
Rugby league hookers
People educated at Papakura High School
Samoa national rugby league team players